This is the Recorded Music NZ list of number-one singles in New Zealand sung in Te Reo Māori during the 2020s decade (the Te Reo Māori O Te Rārangi 10 O Runga chart, also known as the Top 10 Te Reo Māori Singles). The first chart was released on 19 June 2021. The chart was launched to celebrate musicians releasing songs in Te Reo Māori, and in order to be eligible, a song needs be sung in at least 70% Māori. Songs are tracked on the chart using sales, streaming and airplay.

Three musical acts have topped the chart: Stan Walker in collaboration with his niece Ibanez Maeva, Dunedin band Six60 and Gisborne choir Ka Hao, in collaboration with singer and producer Rob Ruha.

Chart

Notes

References

Number-one Te Reo Māori singles
New Zealand Te Reo Māori Singles
2020 Te Reo Māori